Norman Aspin CMG (11 November 1922 – 25 July 2011) was a British diplomat who served as British High Commissioner to Malta from 1976 to 1979 and oversaw the transition of Rhodesia into the modern day state of Zimbabwe.

Early life

Born in Lancashire, he was educated at Darwen Grammar School, and initially read Theology at Durham University in 1940 although his studies were put in abeyance owing to service as a lieutenant in the Royal Navy during the Second World War. Upon Aspin's return to Durham, he switched to reading Geography and graduated in 1947. From there he spent one year working as a Demonstrator in the Geography Department.

Career

Aspin began his career at the Commonwealth Relations Office in 1948. His first overseas posting was to India, where he served until 1951. After returning to a more senior role in the Commonwealth Relations Office for a further two years, he was posted to the Federation of Rhodesia and Nyasaland from 1954 to 1957. This was followed by two years based at HM Treasury.

Aspin became the deputy to the High Commissioner to Sierra Leone in 1961 and later became the deputy to the Ambassador to Israel during which time he was awarded the CMG for his role in the six-day war. After a sabbatical at the Imperial Defence College Aspin was appointed High Commissioner to Malta, a post he held until 1979.

After retiring from the Foreign Office Aspin was active in the East Africa Association and spent his remaining years in Dacre, a small village in Cumbria.

References

Alumni of St John's College, Durham
Companions of the Order of St Michael and St George
High Commissioners of the United Kingdom to Malta
1922 births
2011 deaths
People educated at Darwen Grammar School
Royal Navy officers of World War II
British expatriates in Zimbabwe
British expatriates in India
British expatriates in Sierra Leone
British expatriates in Israel
Civil servants in the Commonwealth Relations Office